Michael Westphal (19 February 1965 – 20 June 1991) was a male tennis player from West Germany.

Westphal participated for his native country in the 1984 Summer Olympics, making it as far as the quarter-finals. The right-hander reached his highest ATP singles ranking of world No. 49 in March 1986.

Westphal died of complications from AIDS on 20 June 1991, aged 26.

Career finals

Singles: 2 (0–2)

References

External links
 
 
 

1965 births
1991 deaths
People from Pinneberg
Olympic tennis players of West Germany
Tennis players at the 1984 Summer Olympics
West German male tennis players
AIDS-related deaths in Germany